Wando is an island in Wando County, South Jeolla Province, South Korea.

Islands of South Jeolla Province
Wando County